This season was Ron McBride's last at Utah. The team won their first two games, before dropping six straight. At 2–6 with only three games remaining, the team was guaranteed a losing record and would be ineligible for bowl play. However, the team then won the final three games of the season, capped by a 13–6 home victory over their biggest rivals, the BYU Cougars, finishing the season with a 5–6 record.

Schedule

Roster

After the season

NFL draft
Three players went in the 2003 NFL Draft, including first rounder and future pro bowler Jordan Gross.

References

Utah
Utah Utes football seasons
Utah Utes football